is a Japanese banner. They are long, narrow flags, attached to a pole with a cross-rod to hold the fabric straight out and prevent it from furling around the rod; this way, the field is always visible and identifiable.

History of use
The nobori were significant on the battlefields of feudal Japan. The nobori of the time were used to denote units within an army; nobori became much more common in the Sengoku period, in use alongside the earlier hata-jirushi.  Though usually used to represent different divisions within an army, nobori were sometimes made identical, so as to produce an impressive and intimidating display of warrior flags.

Today nobori are a common sight outside businesses, restaurants, and retail stores where they advertise a sale, a new product, and simply the name of the business.  They are used during festivals and sports events; in sports they take the place of the banners and signs common among Western audiences.  They are also used to make commercial announcements, appeal for something, and identify a political party during an election campaign.  They may also line the walkways, fences or walls of Shinto shrines or Buddhist temples and frequently bear the names of donors or deceased parishioners.
In recent years, nobori influenced flags are gaining popularity around the world.

See also

Koi Nobori – fish-shaped streamers flown on Kodomo no Hi (Children's Day)
Sashimono – small banners worn on the back of ashigaru foot soldiers and samurai
Uma-jirushi – large heraldic banners of daimyōs or commanders
Umbul-umbul – slightly similar Indonesian vertical banner, common in Java and Bali.

Gallery

Military communication in feudal Japan
Japanese heraldry
Samurai weapons and equipment